Orekhov (masculine) or Orekhova (feminine) may refer to:
Orekhov (surname) (Orekhova), common Russian last name
Orekhov (rural locality), name of several rural localities in Russia
Orekhov, Russian form of Orikhiv, a city in Zaporizhia Oblast, Ukraine